The Helena Symphony Orchestra (HSO) is an American orchestra based in Helena, Montana.  Founded in 1955, the Helena Symphony plays the majority of its concerts at the grand Helena Civic Center and in the summer performs at Carroll College presenting their annual free Summer Symphony to thousands of listeners.  The music director is Allan R. Scott.

Concert season

Regular season

The Helena Symphony and Chorale performs ten concerts on average in a season that lasts from September to May.  Three of those concerts include Christmas specials with a Cathedral of St. Helena performance and two performances of The Nutcracker with the Queen City Ballet in the Helena Civic Center.

References

American orchestras
Musical groups established in 1955
Helena, Montana
Tourist attractions in Helena, Montana
Wikipedia requested audio of orchestras
Musical groups from Montana
1955 establishments in Montana
Performing arts in Montana